The Boxcar Children is a children's book series originally created and written by the American first-grade school teacher Gertrude Chandler Warner. Today, the series includes nearly 160 titles, with more being released every year. The series is aimed at readers in grades 2–6.

Originally published in 1924 by Rand McNally (as The Box-Car Children) and reissued in a shorter revised form in 1942 by Albert Whitman & Company, The Boxcar Children tells the story of four orphaned children, Henry, Jessie, Violet, and Benny Alden. They create a home for themselves in an abandoned boxcar in the forest. They eventually meet their grandfather, who is a wealthy and kind man (although the children had believed him to be cruel). The children decide to live with the grandfather, who moves the beloved boxcar to his backyard so the children can use it as a playhouse. The book was adapted as the film The Boxcar Children in 2014 and the sequel novel Surprise Island was released as a film in 2018. Based on a 2007 online poll, the National Education Association listed the original book as one of its "Teachers' Top 100 Books for Children". In 2012 the original novel was ranked among the all-time "Top 100 Chapter Books", or children's novels, in a survey published by School Library Journal.

In the subsequent books, the children encounter many adventures and mysteries in their neighborhood or at the locations they visit with their grandfather. The majority of the books are set in locations the children are visiting over school holidays such as summer vacation or Christmas break. Only the first 19 stories were written by creator Warner. Other books in the series have been written by other writers, but always feature the byline "Created by Gertrude Chandler Warner". While the Alden children age in Warner's books, and remain younger in the ones published after her death, each book is set around its publication date.

Plot summary of the original novel
The original Boxcar Children novel tells a story of four orphaned Alden children, Henry, Jessie, Violet, and Benny. Not wishing to live with their hard-hearted grandfather, whom they have never met because of his disapproval of their parents' marriage, the children strike out on their own following their parents' death. On a cold night, the children stop at a bakery to ask for food, where they are invited to stay for the night. However, when they overhear the baker and his wife are planning to keep the three older children as labor and send Benny to an orphanage, the children decide to escape and flee to the woods instead.

There they sleep on some pine needles. But Jessie then sees it is about to rain, and frantically searches for some shelter. At that point, she finds an abandoned boxcar and takes her siblings to it. They all renovate it into their new home. They find useful items such as kitchenware at the junkyard, use a stream for water, and collect blueberries for their meals. They also adopt a stray dog that they name Watch. Realizing they cannot live on water and blueberries, Henry walks to a nearby town called Silver City for work. There he meets a young doctor, Dr. Moore, who hires Henry for odd jobs, often paying him in spare food and clothing as well as money. Suspecting that Henry is not telling the full truth about himself, Dr. Moore follows Henry home in secret and sees the children's living conditions. He decides that they are safe for now and that he should allow Henry to tell the truth when he feels comfortable. Mr. Moore gifts Henry a hammer and Henry also takes a few nails from the doctor. With the tools, he and his siblings create a swimming pool and a dam in the stream. Henry also makes a cart for Benny.

Once, while Henry was working at Dr. Moore's house, Dr. Moore invites Henry to see the Field Day competition. He does not tell Henry that it is conducted by James Henry Alden, who is in fact the grandfather of the boxcar children. There, Henry gets to know about a Free-for-all race. Just for enjoyment, he also takes part in it. But then, Henry starts to run in his fastest pace and wins the race. He is awarded a silver cup and 25 dollars by James Henry Alden, his grandfather. But neither of them know that they are a family. Once Henry returns back to his boxcar, his siblings are very glad for him.

At some point, Benny's hair begin to grow, so Jessie cuts them with Violet's scissors. Benny in turn cuts Watch's hair and tries to make a 'J' symbol. This makes Jessie and Violet laugh very hard. However, Violet falls seriously ill. The siblings don't want to go to the hospital because of two reasons: 

They would have to tell their full name, and so their grandfather might find them. 
They don't have enough money to pay to the hospital. So, as they have no option, Henry runs to Dr. Moore to explain him the situation. The doctor takes Violet to his own house instead the hospital, and comforts her. He and Mrs. Moore invite Henry, Jessie and Benny, along with Watch, to stay there as guests.

Meanwhile, the children's grandfather, James Henry Alden, has been offering a reward for news of his missing grandchildren. The doctor connects the missing grandchildren with the ones in his care and goes to speak to Alden, warning him that his grandchildren are afraid of him and encouraging him to befriend the children before revealing who he is. Alden is introduced to the children as a friend of the doctor's. The children find him warm and friendly, so that by the time they learn the truth, they are surprised to learn that he is really their "cruel" grandfather and are more than willing to come live with him.

At their grandfather's house, the children are happy and well-cared for, but speak fondly of their days in the boxcar. They all miss the boxcar too, especially Benny, who wants his cracked, pink cup. So, as a surprise, Mr. Alden arranges to have the boxcar completely restored, repainted, and moved into his backyard where the children can visit it whenever they like. Mr. Alden gets every single piece, even the old, dead stump from which the children used to climb inside. At the end of the novel, the children are very glad and make the boxcar as their clubhouse and happily live.

Characters

Main characters 
(The characters are named here as they are in the revised edition of the original book, and its sequels. The family name in the 1924 original edition is Cordyce rather than Alden.)

Henry James Alden: is the oldest of the Alden children; in most books of the series, Henry is 14 years old (13 in the 1924 edition). He is shown to be calm, hardworking, rational, humble and very protective of his younger siblings. Henry also shows a knack for repairing things and is a natural athlete. In Warner's original books, Henry ages and eventually goes off to college in The Lighthouse Mystery.

Jessica "Jessie" Alden: (Jess in the 1924 original edition) is usually 12 years old and is the older sister. She often acts motherly towards Benny and Violet and even Henry. She is often responsible for cooking. Jessie is described as being very tidy and organized. She is sometimes called Jess, but is mostly referred to as Jessie. She is not afraid of anything, adores the color blue, and is very strong. Jessie becomes shy whenever somebody calls her Jessica.

Violet Alden: is 10 years old in most of the books. She is the most sensitive of the children and is skillful at painting and sewing. She can frequently win over grouchy characters and is good with animals. Violet is often very shy and loves playing the violin. Her favorite color is violet or purple and she often wears one of those colors. She is the shyest of all the children, and sometimes helps Jessie take care of Benny.

Benjamin "Benny" Alden: is the youngest child at 6 years old (5 in the original 1924 edition). He celebrates his seventh birthday in Surprise Island and continues to age throughout the original series, until he is old enough for a department store job in the last original book, "Benny Uncovers a Mystery." Benny is known for his love of all food and the cracked pink cup he found in the dump. His endearingly childish qualities and comments make him a favorite among young readers. He is very enthusiastic. He loves Watch dearly and Benny was the one who named Watch.

Watch: is the dog of the Boxcar children. He acted as a "watchdog" when they lived in the boxcar and protected them. Watch was originally owned by a wealthy lady but ran away and was adopted by the Alden children. The lady was so charmed by the children that she permitted them to keep him. Watch is a Wire Fox Terrier (an Airedale in the 1924 edition), and the children found him while Henry was away at work. He had a thorn in his paw, and Jessie removed it. Because of this, he became known as her dog. In subsequent books, Watch's bed is in Jessie's bedroom.

James Henry Alden: is the wealthy and kind grandfather of the Alden children, allowing them a lot of freedom and always offering them advice. He takes care of the kids after the death of their parents. At first, the kids thought their grandfather was mean, and so they ran away from him, but later on, they realized the goodness of their grandfather and came to live with him. James Henry Alden also organizes the Field Day competitions.

Dr. Moore: (Dr. McAllister in the original 1924 edition) is the man who gave Henry a job and checked Violet when she was ill. He is the very same person who connected Henry, Jessie, Violet, Benny and Watch with their grandfather.

Secondary characters
Mrs. McGregor: The Aldens' housekeeper. Her husband was first seen in the third book of the series.

Mr. McGregor: He mows the lawn and he is Mr.  Alden's conductor. He is also married to Mrs. McGregor.

Mike: Mike is Benny's best friend and appeared on Surprise Island.

John Joseph "Joe" Alden and Alice: The children's cousins/aunt and uncle. (Called both, but mostly cousins) Joe was first seen in the second book of the series, Surprise Island. Alice was first introduced in The Yellow House Mystery; she also married Joe in the same book. They moved to a new house in The Mystery of the Singing Ghost. They adopted Soo Lee from Korea.

Aunt Jane and Uncle Andy: The children's great aunt (Grandfather Alden's sister) and her husband. Aunt Jane was once unkind, but was changed in Mystery Ranch, the fourth book of the series.

John Carter: An employee of the children's grandfather. Does investigation and carries out the children's grandfather's wishes "off camera".

Animated film
In April 2014, the animated film The Boxcar Children was released. The voice of Grandfather Alden is played by Martin Sheen, and Dr. Moore is voiced by J. K. Simmons. Zachary Gordon, Joey King, Mackenzie Foy, and Jadon Sand voiced Henry, Jessie, Violet, and Benny respectively. The film is also available on DVD.

The film debuted at the Toronto International Film Festival / Kids (TiFF/Kids) in April 2014 and went on to play at 15 more festivals including Woods Hole International Film Festival, St. Louis International Film Festival and the Gijón International Film Festival in Spain. The film won Best Animated Feature Film at the 2015 St. Tropez International Film Festival.

The film was released by Entertainment One. It had a limited theatrical run in North America, came out on DVD and VOD on August 19, 2014. Streaming and TV rights were sold exclusively to Netflix on October 4, 2014. The film was directed and produced by Daniel Chuba and Mark A.Z. Dippe. The executive producer was Maureen Sargent Gorman.

The sequel film, The Boxcar Children: Surprise Island, was originally planned to be released in the fall 2017. However, Fathom Events released the film in select theaters starting May 8, 2018, followed by a DVD release on August 14, 2018.

Series

After the first novel, the children become amateur sleuths, and the subsequent series involves the children solving various mysteries and occasionally traveling to other locations as they do so. They stumble across a mystery no matter where they are, whether on vacation or in their own backyard. They usually solve the mystery with very little adult intervention, although adults are present in the novel (the author said she wrote about mostly-unsupervised children because that would appeal to children). Some of the mysteries border on the supernatural, although the practical Henry and Jessie always find the sensible reason for anything that appears other-worldly. Most of the mysteries involve thefts and usually involve the Alden children helping someone they know.

The series are divided into mysteries and specials; all of the specials were written after Warner's death. , there are 159 mysteries and 21 specials in the series.

About the author

Warner's life was chronicled in the biography Gertrude Chandler Warner and the Boxcar Children by Mary Ellen Ellsworth, illustrated by Marie DeJohn, which tells the story of Warner's childhood living across the street from the railroad tracks, her bouts with poor health, her teaching career, her earliest attempts at writing, and her inspiration for The Boxcar Children.

In July 2004, a museum in Putnam, Connecticut, was opened in a red boxcar to honor Gertrude Warner and the Boxcar Children series. She is buried in Grove Street Cemetery, Putnam, Connecticut.

As she wrote the story, Warner read it to her classes and rewrote it many times so the words were easy to understand. Some of her pupils spoke other languages at home and were just learning English, so The Boxcar Children gave them a fun story that was easy to read. Warner once wrote that the original book "raised a storm of protest from librarians who thought the children were having too good a time without any parental control! That is exactly why children like it!"

See also

 List of Boxcar Children novels

References

External links
  
 The Boxcar Children Page
 

American children's novels
Novel series
Novels about orphans
Series of children's books
Children's mystery novels
Juvenile series